Paulo Aokuso (born 20 May 1997) is an Australian Samoan boxer. He competed in the men's light heavyweight event at the 2020 Summer Olympics. In the Round of 16 in the light heavyweight bracket Aokuso lost narrowly on points to Spain’s Gazimagomed Jalidov.

Early years 
Aokosu comes from Mount Druitt in Sydney's west. He came from a family of sportsmen and women and showed sporting potential from an early age. Aokosu was a competent shot put and discus thrower in his teenage years before trying boxing in 2013 as a 16-year-old. His sister Filoi Aokosu took the silver medal in discus at the 2014 Australian Under-20s Championships and earned a place in the World Junior Championships in Oregon.

Aokosu has much support from his family and his mother, Nessie, would spar with him. He joined the Queensland Academy of Boxing in 2014.

Achievements 
His time at the Queensland Academy of Boxing was well spent and Aokuso became a dedicated boxer. He participated in the Asia-Oceania Olympic qualifying event in Amman, Jordan in March 2020. Aokosu unanimously defeated Vietnam's Manh Nguyen to lock in a tournament semi-final berth.

Aokosu then beat 2019 World Championship silver medallist Dilshod Ruzmetov from Uzbekistan and earned a place at the Tokyo 2020 Olympics.

Professional boxing record

References

External links
 

1997 births
Living people
Australian male boxers
Olympic boxers of Australia
Boxers at the 2020 Summer Olympics